Live at the Montreal Jazz Festival is a live album by American jazz pianist Ahmad Jamal featuring performances recorded at the Montreal International Jazz Festival in 1985 and released on the Atlantic label.

Critical reception
The double album was released in 1986. Billboard listed it as a "recommended" album in November of that year. Scott Yanow, in his review for Allmusic, states "This particular group is often reminiscent of Jamal's trios of the '50s, although with more modern bass playing and some denser piano than before".

Track listing
All compositions by Ahmad Jamal except as indicated
 "Yellow Fellow" (Christian Paulin) – 15:02 
 "Make Someone Happy" (Betty Comden, Adolph Green, Jule Styne) – 7:10 
 "Acorn" – 7:21 
 "Crossroads" – 8:52 
 "Rossiter Road" – 8:54 
 "'Round Midnight" (Thelonious Monk) – 6:52 
 "Footprints" (Wayne Shorter) – 8:09 
 "Ebony" (Jack DeJohnette) – 8:34

Personnel
Ahmad Jamal – piano
James Cammack – bass
Herlin Riley – drums 
Selden Newton – percussion

References 

Atlantic Records live albums
Ahmad Jamal live albums
1986 live albums